1861 Komenský, provisional designation , is an Eoan asteroid from the outer region of the asteroid belt, estimated to measure approximately 15 kilometers in diameter. It was discovered on 24 November 1970, by Czech astronomer Luboš Kohoutek at the Bergedorf Observatory in Hamburg, Germany, and named after John Amos Comenius.

Orbit and classification 

Komenský is a member of the Eos family, the largest asteroid family in the outer main belt consisting of nearly 10,000 asteroids. It orbits the Sun in the outer main-belt at a distance of 2.8–3.2 AU once every 5 years and 3 months (1,918 days). Its orbit has an eccentricity of 0.06 and an inclination of 10° with respect to the ecliptic. Komenskýs observation arc begins with its official discovery observation, as no precoveries and no previous identifications were made.

Physical characteristics 

According to the survey carried out by NASA's Wide-field Infrared Survey Explorer with its subsequent NEOWISE mission, Komenský measures 14.8 kilometers in diameter and its surface has an albedo of 0.158. Based on an absolute magnitude of 11.7, and assuming an albedo in the range of 0.05 to 0.25, the asteroid has a generic mean diameter of 12 to 28 kilometers. As of 2016, Komenskýs composition, rotation period and shape remain unknown.

Naming 

This minor planet was named in honor of Czech educational reformer and theologist, John Amos Comenius (1592–1670), known as Jan Amos Komenský in the original Czech language. He is considered the father of modern education and spend most of his life in exile. The official  was published by the Minor Planet Center on 20 December 1974.

References

External links 
 Asteroid Lightcurve Database (LCDB), query form (info )
 Dictionary of Minor Planet Names, Google books
 Asteroids and comets rotation curves, CdR – Observatoire de Genève, Raoul Behrend
 Discovery Circumstances: Numbered Minor Planets (1)-(5000) – Minor Planet Center
 
 

001861
Discoveries by Luboš Kohoutek
Named minor planets
19701124